= WIN-2299 =

Names
- Preferred IUPAC name 2-(Diethylamino)ethyl cyclopentyl(hydroxy)(thiophen-2-yl)acetate

Identifiers
CAS Number	15421-88-2; 3737-35-7 (HCl)
3D model (JSmol)	Interactive image
ChemSpider	141215
ECHA InfoCard	100.035.835
EC Number	239-435-8
PubChem CID	160714
UNII	DEJ5KD7TDP
CompTox Dashboard (EPA)	DTXSID60934958
- InChI: InChI=1S/C17H27NO3S/c1-3-18(4-2)11-12-21-16(19)17(20,14-8-5-6-9-14)15-10-7-13-22-15/h7,10,13-14,20H,3-6,8-9,11-12H2,1-2H3 Key: ASXBIKGZCPZCAN-UHFFFAOYSA-N; InChI=1/C17H27NO3S/c1-3-18(4-2)11-12-21-16(19)17(20,14-8-5-6-9-14)15-10-7-13-22-15/h7,10,13-14,20H,3-6,8-9,11-12H2,1-2H3 Key: ASXBIKGZCPZCAN-UHFFFAOYAH
- SMILES: O=C(OCCN(CC)CC)C(O)(C1CCCC1)C2=CC=CS2

Properties
Chemical formula	C_{17}H_{27}NO_{3}S
Molar mass	325.47 g·mol^{−1}
- Except where otherwise noted, data are given for materials in their standard state (at 25 °C [77 °F], 100 kPa). Infobox references

WIN-2299 is an anticholinergic drug. Human reactions to WIN-2299 include sedation (2 mg), LSD-like reactions (6 mg), and an acute delirious episode (10 mg).
